Chennai is home to the second largest vehicular population in India, behind New Delhi. The total road network in the city's metropolitan area is 2,780 km. With Chennai's vehicular population having experienced a surge in the late 1990s, several flyovers were built to reduce the traffic congestion in the city. Of about  15,600 million invested by the state government between 2005 and 2016, Chennai cornered a major chunk of the investment. As of 2016, there were 42 functional flyovers in the city and about 30 bridges, catering to the city's vehicular population of about 12 million, including about 600,000 cars. In addition, more than 36 flyovers are in the pipeline.

Beginnings
The city's first flyover is the Anna Flyover at the Gemini Circle built in 1973, which was the third in India, after the ones at Kemps Corner and Marine Drive in Mumbai. It was also the longest flyover in the country when it was built. No major flyovers were built in the following 20 years or so. The number of flyovers in the city began to rise in the late 1990s when a string of nine flyovers were built across the city during the tenure of the then Mayor of the city, M. K. Stalin.

Road space
As of 1 April 2013, the total vehicle population of Chennai is 3,881,850, including 3,053,233 two wheelers.

The flyover construction in the city has resulted in the addition of a mere 12.4 km of extra road capacity between 2005 and 2014. As of 2014, the total length of operational flyovers in the city was 13.5 km.

List of flyovers
Anna Flyover
MIT Flyover
Alwarpet Flyover
IIT Madras Flyover
Doveton Flyover
Perambur Flyover
Madhuravoyal grade separator
Padi grade separator
Koyambedu grade separator
Kathipara grade separator
Tambaram flyover
Peters Road flyover
Conran Smith Road flyover
Dr. Radhakrishnan Road flyover
Music Academy flyover
Panagal Park flyover
TTK Road flyover
Mahalingapuram flyover
Pantheon Road flyover
Thirumangalam flyover
Moolakkadai flyover
Madhavaram Roundtana Byepass Flyover
Vandalur flyover
Airport flyover
Pallavaram Flyover
Pallavaram Railway Station Flyover
Pallavaram New Unidirectional Flyover
Vyasarpadi flyover
Mint flyover
G N Chetty Road flyover
Velachery Taramani Road - Kamakshi Hospital Junction flyover
Medavakkam Junction flyover
Keelkattalai flyover
Tambaram Sanitorium (Bharatha Matha Street) flyover
Kilkattalai - Pallavaram Radial Road Junction flyover
Velachery Junction flyover
Vadapalani Junction flyover
Porur flyover
Anna Arch flyover - Arumbakkam
 Anna Arch flyover Aminjikarai
Koyambedu CMBT flyover
Retteri Flyover
Pallikaranai Flyover

Criticism
Between 2005 and 2014, the state government has spent over 15,590 million erecting flyovers and grade separators, of which 11,440 million (88%) was invested in Chennai. The city hosts all 21 elevated urban corridors open to traffic in the state in 2014.

In the late 1990s, a Traffic Action Plan was prepared for the city. It is said the brain behind the traffic action plan was the Society of Indian Automobile Manufacturers (SIAM), which organised seminars in hotels and conducted traffic studies and public opinion surveys. The investments made by the automobile industry resulted in an increase in the city's per capita ownership of cars, which by 2012 was second in the country, behind New Delhi.

Various global studies indicate that flyovers and elevated roads tend to "induce" new traffic because of the apparent extra road space, and this held true in the case of Chennai, according to experts. The number of vehicles on Chennai's roads had increased dramatically since the late 1990s, resulting in regular traffic snarls.

Critics also say that, despite costing 4 to 5 times a normal road, flyovers do not resolve the problem of traffic congestion. For the 15,500 million spent between 2005 and 2014 by the state government, critics opine that the government could instead have invested in buying about 7,000 public transport buses or laid more than 2,000 km of dedicated cycle lanes or built an extensive bus rapid transit system covering about 150 km.

New projects
Thirteen more flyover projects have been announced by the state government: Kattupakkam, Akkarai, Ambattur, Avadi, Madhavaram, Ramapuram, Kundrathur, Kaiveli, Selaiyur, Korattur, Vadapalani-P.T. Rajan Salai junction, Madhya Kailash and Madipakkam.

See also 
 Transport in Chennai

References

Bridges and flyovers in Chennai
Chennai-related lists